The 2011 Morocco Tennis Tour – Meknes was a professional tennis tournament played on outdoor clay courts. It was part of the 2011 ATP Challenger Tour. It took place in Meknes, Morocco between 14 and 19 February 2011.

ATP entrants

Seeds

 Rankings are as of February 7, 2011.

Other entrants
The following players received wildcards into the singles main draw:
  Anas Fattar
  Yassine Idmbarek
  Hicham Khaddari
  Talal Ouahabi

The following players received entry from the qualifying draw:
  Victor Crivoi
  Gerard Granollers-Pujol
  Leonardo Kirche
  Franko Škugor

Champions

Singles

 Jaroslav Pospíšil def.  Guillermo Olaso, 6–1, 3–6, 6–3

Doubles

 Treat Conrad Huey /  Simone Vagnozzi def.  Alessio di Mauro /  Alessandro Motti, 6–1, 6–2

External links
 

Meknes
2011